Ji-hwan Bae (born July 26, 1999) is a South Korean professional baseball second baseman for the Pittsburgh Pirates of Major League Baseball (MLB). He made his MLB debut in 2022.

Career

Amateur and minor league baseball 
Born in July 1999, Bae attended Kyeongbuk High School in Daegu. He grew up as a fan of South Korean professional baseball, and began watching Major League Baseball when fellow South Korea native Shin-Soo Choo joined the Cleveland Indians. Bae soon became a fan of Hyun-jin Ryu, Jung-ho Kang, and José Altuve. Bae represented South Korea at the 2017 U-18 Baseball World Cup. During the tournament, he hit for a .286 batting average with five RBIs, six runs scored, six walks and two stolen bases. Bae was projected to be a first round pick in the 2017 KBO League draft.

On September 23, 2017, the Atlanta Braves announced the signing of Bae as a free agent. General manager John Coppolella claimed that Bae was the youngest Asian baseball player to sign with the Braves in nearly two decades. By joining the Braves, Bae would have become the second player since , who signed with the Chicago Cubs in 2015, to leave a South Korean high school directly for professional baseball in the United States. On November 21, 2017, Major League Baseball voided his contract with the Braves as a result of fraudulent contract negotiations. The New York Times reported that, although Bae had agreed to sign for $300,000, the Braves planned to pay him an additional $600,000 by reallocating money promised to other signees. The KBO League barred Bae from signing with any South Korean professional team for two years because he had skipped the KBO's draft to join the Braves organization, where he appeared with Atlanta's Florida Instructional League team. 

In March 2018, the Pittsburgh Pirates signed Bae for a reported signing bonus of $1.25 million. Bae finished the 2019 season with the Greensboro Grasshoppers. He then played for Geelong-Korea in the Australian Baseball League during the offseason. The 2020 Minor League baseball season was cancelled due to the COVID-19 pandemic, and Bae was subsequently assigned to the Altoona Curve in 2021. At the Double-A level, he recorded a slash line of .278/.359/.413 with 12 doubles, five triples, seven homers and 31 RBIs in 83 games. After the minor league season ended, Bae was assigned to the Peoria Javelinas and selected to the Arizona Fall League Fall Stars Game. Bae spent most of the 2022 season with the Indianapolis Indians, where he appeared in 108 games, slashed .289/.362/.430 with 23 doubles, six triples, eight home runs and 53 RBIs.

Pittsburgh Pirates
On September 23, 2022, Bae made his major league debut. He started at second base for the Pirates in a game against the Chicago Cubs, was walked once, hit a single, and stole two bases.

Personal life 
In April 2019, Bae was questioned on charges of assaulting his girlfriend while in high school. As a result of the allegations that he slapped, choked, and kicked the girl, he was convicted of assault in court in Daegu and required to pay a fine of ₩2 million. Following the conviction, Major League Baseball also suspended Bae without pay for 30 games.

References

External links

1999 births
Living people
Sportspeople from Daegu
South Korean expatriate baseball players in the United States
South Korean expatriate baseball players in Australia
Major League Baseball players from South Korea
Major League Baseball second basemen
Pittsburgh Pirates players
Gulf Coast Pirates players
Greensboro Grasshoppers players
Altoona Curve players
Indianapolis Indians players
Peoria Javelinas players
Florida Complex League Pirates players